Rabbi Yisroel Hager (born April 19, 1945), is one of the two current Grand Rabbis of Vizhnitz in Bnei Brak and a member of Moetzes Gedolei HaTorah (Council of great Torah Sages) of Agudat Israel.

Early life and biography
Rabbi Yisroel was born in Tel Aviv to his father, Rabbi Moshe Yehoshua Hager (1916-2012), the previous leader and Grand Rabbi of Vizhnitz followers in Bnei Brak, and to his mother, Rebbetzin Leah Esther. On June 2, 1963, at the age of 18, he married Rebbetzin Sarah Chaya Chana Twersky, the daughter of Rabbi Meshulom Zishe Twersky, previous Grand Rabbi of Chernobyl in Bnei Brak. Shortly after his marriage, he was appointed by his grandfather Grand Rabbi Chaim Meir Hager (1887-1972), to serve as a Rabbi of the Vizhnitz synagogue and a few years later, in 1972 (after his grandfather died and his father took over the leadership of the Vizhnitz Chassidim), he served as the Chief Rabbi of the Kiryas Vizhnitz neighborhood in Bnei Brak. In 1984, after complicated and tensed relationship between him and his parents and according to his father's orders, he was ostracized from his position as a Chief Rabbi and was exiled from the Vizhnitz neighborhood as well. In 1990, his father appointed instead of him as a Chief Rabbi of Kiryas Vizhnitz his younger brother, Grand Rabbi Menachem Mendel Hager. After nearly 18 years of boycott, and after Rabbi Yisroel was involved in a car accident, suffered from severe injuries and was hospitalized in a critical condition, his father agreed to visit him, and shortly afterwards, through the brokerage and help of his father's closest associates and his stepmother, the second wife of his father, Rebbetzin Sheindel, he eventually reconciled with his father and gradually paved his way back to his position as a Chief Rabbi and the main successor of his father's followers. In March 2012, after his father died, the overwhelming majority of his father's followers crowned him as their Grand Rabbi and spiritual leader.

Family
Rabbi Yisroel and Rebbetzin Sarah Chaya Chana have eight children - three sons and five daughters:
Rebbezin Malka Henya, married her first cousin, Rabbi Yitzchok, son of Grand Rabbi David Twersky of Skverer Hassidim in New Square, New York.
Rebbetzin Miriam, the wife of her father's first cousin, Rabbi Boruch Shamshon Hager, Grand Rabbi of Vizhnitz in Beit Shemesh, Israel.
Rebbetzin Rechel Dvorah, the wife of Rabbi Chaim Tzvi Meislish, grandson of Grand Rabbi Moshe Teitelbaum of Satmar. Serves as a Chief Rabbi and a rosh yeshiva of the Satmar community in Israel.
Rabbi Chaim Meir, used to serve as  rabbi of Vizhnitz in Borough Park, Brooklyn. He is  married to Rebbetzin Ratza Hendel, daughter of Rabbi Aharon Teitelbaum of Nirbatur community in Borough Park. In 2020, he relocated to B'nei B'rak where his father appointed him as his deputy and Rov of the Vizhnitz community there. Most of his followers consider this a signal that he was to succeed his father as Rebbe.
Rabbi Yitzchok Shaye, married Rebbetzin Sarah Leah, daughter of Grand Rabbi Dov Berish Paneth of Deyzh in Jerusalem.
Rebbetzin Tzippora Bracha, the wife of Rabbi Naftoli Tzvi, son of Rabbi Nochum Efraim Teitelbaum of the Volove community in Borough Park
Rabbi Yakov Mordechai, married Rebbetzin  Sheva Rachel, the daughter of Rabbi Avrohom Boruch Rottenberg of Kosson Borough Park.
Rebbetzin Sheindel, the wife of Rabbi Menachem Mendel, son of Rabbi Yisroel Eliezer Hager, Chief Rabbi of Seret Vizhnitz Hassidim in Jerusalem.

References

External links
  So what is going on in Vizhnitz? from Ynet

Haredi rabbis in Israel
Hasidic rabbis in Israel
Rebbes of Vizhnitz
1945 births
Living people